Wong Wai (born 17 September 1992 in Hong Kong) is a Hong Kong professional footballer who currently plays as a midfielder for Hong Kong Premier League club Lee Man.

Club career

Early career
Wong Wai studied in Yu Chun Keung Memorial College and graduated after form 5 study. He represented various youth levels of the national team.

Sham Shui Po
He joined Third Division club Sham Shui Po when he was young. In 2008, youth team members were all promoted to the club's first team in order to gain experience. In the first season, the club reached the final of Junior Shield, which they eventually lost 0–2 to Shatin. Wong Wai played 5 out of 6 games and scored a goal in the semi-finals.

In his second season, he scored 12 goals throughout the season, including 3 goals in the promotion play-offs, which he helped the club gain promotion to the Second Division.

Wong Wai helped the club gain promotion to the First Division for the first time in club history by scoring 12 goals in 19 games in the 2010–11 season. In the 2011–12 season, he failed to help the team prevent relegation to the Second Division, although he featured in most of the matches.

Metro Gallery
He linked up with former Sham Shui Po player and manager Lee Chi Kin and joined Metro Gallery in July 2012.

Tai Po
After the conclusion of his contract, Wong once again followed Lee Chi Kin, this time to newly promoted HKPL club Tai Po. He was revealed as a Tai Po player during the club's season kick-off event on 19 July 2016.

On 17 July 2019, it was revealed that Wong had left Tai Po at the end of his contract.

Eastern
On 27 September 2019, once again following Lee Chi Kin, Wong signed for Eastern.

HK U23
Before the beginning of the Hong Kong Premier League 2021/22 season, the newly formed HK U23 announced that Wong joined the club on loan for the season as one of the over-aged players.

Lee Man
On 8 July 2022, Wong signed for Lee Man.

International career
He had represented the Hong Kong national under-19 football team and participated in the 2010 AFC U-19 Championship qualification held in Indonesia. He scored one goal in four games.

On 16 February 2013, he received his first call-up from the senior team for the 2015 AFC Asian Cup qualification against Vietnam. However, he was excluded from the final squad announced on 15 March 2013.

On 31 May 2013, he was included into the 20-men final squad for an international friendly match against the Philippines held on 4 June. He made his debut during the match, as he entered in the 77th minute as a substitute for Leung Chun Pong.

Career statistics

Club
 As of 19 May 2021

International

International goals

Notes
1.  Others include Hong Kong Third Division Champion Play-off.
2.  Since Sham Shui Po was competing in lower divisions, they could only join the Junior Shield instead of Senior Shield.
3.  Hong Kong Junior Challenge Shield was not held in the 2009–10 season.

Honours
Eastern
 Hong Kong Senior Shield: 2019–20
 Hong Kong FA Cup: 2019–20
Hong Kong Sapling Cup: 2020–21

Pegasus
 Hong Kong FA Cup: 2015–16
 Hong Kong Sapling Cup: 2015–16

Tai Po
 Hong Kong Premier League: 2018–19
 Hong Kong Sapling Cup: 2016–17

References

External links
 
 

1992 births
Living people
Association football midfielders
Hong Kong First Division League players
Hong Kong Premier League players
Hong Kong footballers
Sham Shui Po SA players
Hong Kong international footballers
Yokohama FC Hong Kong players
TSW Pegasus FC players
Tai Po FC players
Eastern Sports Club footballers
HK U23 Football Team players
Lee Man FC players
Footballers at the 2014 Asian Games
Asian Games competitors for Hong Kong